Lenny Fontana is an American house music DJ from New York City.

Biography
Fontana first began deejaying professionally in the mid-1980s, playing at clubs such as Studio 54 and The Underground NYC. His first major exposure was with the track "A Mystical Journey", which hit #30 on the US Billboard Hot Dance Club/Play chart in 1996. He won international recognition as part of the production team for Powerhouse featuring Duane Harden, who scored a #1 dance hit in the US with "What You Need"; the song also hit #13 on the UK Singles Chart. In 2000, he returned to the UK chart with "Chocolate Sensation" (featuring DJ Shorty), peaking at #39. He continues to make international appearances regularly.
His 2008 single "Wait 4 U" (a collaboration with UK producer Ridney and vocalist Larisa) was released through the Ministry of Sound (Germany) in June that year. The track had already been used on Germany's Next Top Model 2008, and Ministry's.
2011 Reportage "A Tribute To Larry Levan" The show was first broadcast on BBC 6 Music in July 2011 as a 6 part series, 10 hour documentary. It has now been broadcast three times on BBC Radio 6 Music. In 2015 Lenny Fontana & D Train (music group) "Raise Your Hands"(Karmic Power Records) was a huge success as WMC Miami (Winter Music Conference) including remixes by David Morales.

In 2016, D-Train's follow-up single "When You Feel What Love Has" (Karmic Power Records) received worldwide attention and hit the #4 position on the Music Week Club Chart UK. With over 650 spins a week on daytime radio rotation in the US, the song hit the #31 position on the Nielsen Billboard Indicator Radio Chart (USA). In 2019, Fontana has worked with Chris Willis (the voice of David Guetta on a collaboration called “Top Of the World” (Double Up Records).

In 2021 Bucks Music Group has signed house DJ Lenny Fontana to a worldwide exclusive songwriting deal.

True House Stories interview series (podcast) 
In summer of 2020 Lenny Fontana launched his weekly Facebook Live Stream show "True House Stories". Since end of 2020 the podcast "True House Stories" series is available on YouTube, Spotify, Apple Podcast, Deezer, Amazon, Google Podcast, iHeart Radio etc. The following artists have been interviewed by Lenny Fontana: Carl Cox, DJ Sneak, Little Louie Vega, David Morales, Danny Tenaglia, Marshall Jefferson, Mousse T., Norman Jay, Michael Gray and many more.

TRUE HOUSE STORIES PODCAST 
Espisodes

TRUE HOUSE STORIES PODCAST (Special Shows)

Discography 
Singles (selection)

Remixes (selection)

See also
DJ UCH, American radio presenter, mixshow DJ, and house music producer

References

External links
Lenny Fontana at Discogs
Offizielle Website
Offizielle Webseite von Lenny Fontana´s Label
Instagram
True House Stories Podcast Website

American house musicians
American DJs
House musicians
Record producers from New York (state)
Living people
DJs from New York City
Musicians from New York (state)
Year of birth missing (living people)
Remixers
Electronic dance music DJs
FFRR Records artists